"200 MPH" is a song by Puerto Rican rapper Bad Bunny featuring American DJ Diplo. The song was released through Rimas Entertainment on December 24, 2018 as the seventh single from his debut studio album, X 100pre (2018).

Music video
The video for "200 MPH" was released on April 27, 2019 on Bad Bunny's YouTube channel. As of June 2019, the music video for the song has received over 20 million views.

Charts

Weekly charts

Year-end charts

Certifications

References

2018 singles
2018 songs
Bad Bunny songs
Spanish-language songs
Songs written by Bad Bunny